.soulger. was a Christian rock band that formed in Holdenville, Oklahoma, in mid-2000 and broke up late 2004.

The band recorded one demo EP and one full-length debut album, entitled Rescue Me, which was recorded in the band's home studio on a limited budget. Rescue Me received numerous outstanding reviews, including those from leading representatives at Taxi, the world's largest independent A&R company, who gave Rescue Me 7 stars out of 10 for overall performance and production.<fact|date=September 2008>

In early 2007, guitarist bOoGiE and drummer Joe started a new band called The Runwayexit.

Members
Songwriter/Vocalist - Janet Farris
Vocalist/Guitarist - bOoGiE aka Terry Farris II
Drummer/Percussionist - Joe aka Jordan Farris
Live Bassist - Fowl aka Jason Harrison

Discography
Rescue Me Demo EP (Publicly Unreleased) (December 2001)
Rescue Me (July 2003)

References

Christian rock groups from Oklahoma
Musical groups established in 2000